The 2003-04 Division 1 season was the 39th of the competition of the first-tier football in Senegal.  The tournament was organized by the Senegalese Football Federation.  The season began on 13 December 2003 and finished on 9 October 2004.  ASC Diaraf won the tenth title, the next club in Senegal to win the tenth title after ASC Jeanne d'Arc last season.  The total number of national championship titles would remain tied with ten until Diaraf retook the totals as they won their eleventh and recent in the 2010 season.  Diaraf along with AS Douanes would compete in the 2005 CAF Champions League the following season.  ASEC Ndiambour participated in the 2005 CAF Confederation Cup, as AS Douanes also won the 2004 Senegalese Cup and were second place in the league, as Douanes qualified into the 2005 CAF Champions League, Dakar Université Club, the fourth place club participated in the 2005 CAF Confederation Cup.

The season would be a record-breaking season and the only season featuring twenty clubs.  A record of 380 matches were played and 590 goals were scored more than double than last season.

ASC Jeanne d'Arc was the defending team of the title.  Diaraf achieved a record 72 points, second Douanes with 69 points and 65 and third ASEC Ndiambour with 65 points.

The following season would feature eighteen clubs in which four clubs were relegated to Division 2.

Participating clubs

 ASC Linguère
 Compagnie sucrière sénégalaise (Senegalese Sugar Company)
 ASC Port Autonome
 AS Douanes
 ASC Jeanne d'Arc
 ASFA Dakar
 AS Police
 ASC Saloum
 US Gorée
 Casa Sport

 ASC HLM
 ASC Diaraf
 US Rail
 Dakar Université Club
 SONACOS
 ASEC Ndiambour
 Stade de Mbour
 AS Khombole
 US Ouakam
 Guédiawaye FC

Overview
The league was contested by 20 teams with ASC Diaraf again winning the championship.

League standings

Footnotes

External links
Historic results at rsssf.com

Senegal
Senegal Premier League seasons